Tecson/Ticzon is a Chinese Filipino surname. The ‘Tecson’ of San Miguel, Bulacan, the Tecson of Dumaguete, Negros Oriental, the Tecson of Iligan, Lanao del Norte, the Tecson of Balanga, Bataan, the Tecson of Candaba, Pampanga, the Tecson of Cabiao, Nueva Ecija, the Tecson of San Quintin, Pangasinan and the ‘Ticzon’ of San Pablo City, Laguna, the Tecson of San Jose, Batangas, and the Tecson of Tanay, Rizal are descendants of the three ‘Tek Sun’ brothers from Guangzhou, China. The tombstone of Jose Tecson (Hokkien ; d. 1728 AD), one of the Tek Sun brothers, is in the church of San Andres Apostol Church of Candaba, Pampanga. Jose Tecson's name is written in Traditional Chinese characters: 扶西德孫墓, which when read in Hokkien POJ: Hû-se Tek-sun Bō͘, lit. Jose Tecson's Grave, and upper right: 仙礁 (POJ:Sian-ta), and upper left: 高律 (POJ:Ko-lu̍t), recording "Santa Cruz".

The surname, Tecson, is a Spanish transliteration of Philippine Hokkien ; Tâi-lô: Tik-sun. Most Chinese Filipinos whose ancestors came to the Philippines prior to 1898 use a Hispanicized surname, spelled with Spanish orthography using the Abecedario (Spanish Alphabet). Many Filipinos who have Hispanicized Chinese surnames are usually no longer full Chinese, but are usually Chinese mestizos (Mestizos de Sangley). According to Weedy Tan (from Manila), some Northern Chinese had two-syllable family names. It is possible that a few of the names below may not be uniquely Filipino but were also used in China. However, names ending in -son, -zon, and -co must have been first used in the Philippines. The Hundred Family Surnames classical Chinese text records a few Chinese surnames ending in 孫, such as 長孫 (POJ:Tióng-sun), 仲孫 (POJ:Tiōng-sun), 公孫 (POJ:Kong-sun), 顓孫 (POJ:Choan-sun), etc.

According to the 2010 United States Census, Tecson is the 28498th most common surname in the United States, belonging to 837 individuals. Tecson is most common among Asian/Pacific Islander (88.05%) individuals. According to data collected by Forebears in 2014, Tecson is the 203rd most common surname in the Philippines, occurring in 33,834 individuals.

People Surnamed Tecson 
 Trinidad Tecson – known as the "Mother of Biak-na-Bato" and "Mother of Mercy", fought to gain Philippines independence.
 Florentino Tecson – was a Filipino Visayan lawyer, politician, editor, writer, and labor leader from Cebu, Philippines.
 Pablo Tecson – was an officer in the Revolutionary Army serving under Gen. Gregorio del Pilar and a representative to the Malolos Congress.
 Simon Ocampo Tecson – a revolutionary colonel of the Siege of Baler who fought in the Philippine-American War and whose house, the Tecson House, is the place where the ratification of Philippine Constitution took place with Emilio Aguinaldo and was signed and was, for sometime, was used as the headquarters of Aguinaldo.
 Richie Ticzon –  is a Filipino former professional basketball player and coach. Nicknamed The Velvet Touch.
 Major General Arsenio L. Tecson – one of the three generals who fought a ''coup'' staged by the military group Reformed Armed Forces Movement (RAM) to destabilize the administration of Corazon Aquino.

References 

Chinese Filipino organizations